The Humans is an ongoing American comic book series from Image Comics created by writer Keenan Marshall Keller (Galactic Breakdown) and artist Tom Neely (All Crime Comics, Henry & Glenn Forever, Popeye).

Plot
The series focuses on the Humans outlaw biker gang based in an alternate 1970s Bakersfield, California, described as "a high-octane, no-holds-barred, ape-biker-gang chopper cruise back into '70s exploitation genre bliss," where the dominant species are anthropomorphic apes, and humans (called "Skins") are used as pets or slaves, similar and Spiritual Successor to Planet of the Apes.

Humans For Life (Issues #0-4)
The Bakersfield charter of the Humans MC consists of brothers Bobby and Johnny Moore, Marra, Karns, Crispin, Mojo, Doc, Nada, and Bricks.

As the Humans MC gathers to bury Mojo, a rival club called the Skabbs shows up and a fight ensues. The Humans finish the rumble, with Bobby defeating the Skabbs' president by punching his head through Mojo's headstone. Continuing the wake, the Humans return to their clubhouse at Mighty Joe's Junkyard and party around a funeral pyre they erect for Mojo's bike. As the party continues, Johnny, recently returned from Vietnam, rejoins the crew.

The next day, Bobby wakes Johnny from his nightmares of the war to introduce him to his idea for striking it big with a newly created drug called "Spazm" - a hallucinogenic form of speed created by Doc. Bobby plans to use the profits of the drug to get out from under the thumb of their boss, Abe Simian.

After Johnny is reunited with his bike, Moonbeam, the Humans attend a "Skin fight" (human cockfighting) at Abe's business, Flex Trucking. A meeting is held in Abe's office, consisting of Abe and the presidents of three MCs: Bobby of the Humans, Marcus of the Haterz, and Reeko Santini of the Madfückers. Abe hires the Humans to deliver two truckloads of the Haterz' cannabis from their Oakland charter to the Madfückers in Los Angeles, then deliver the Madfückers' five-crate meth shipment to Bakersfield.

Wanting a bigger cut for all the risk, Bobby initially demands from Abe ten percent of the profits. When Abe asks for a wager, Bobby's best skin against his, Bobby asks for fifteen percent if he wins, or the Humans will do both runs for free. To win the fight, Bobby injects one of their fighters with Spazm.

Volume 2 (Issues #5-10)
As the Humans make the run to LA, they fight off Victor's Legion, a gang of desert bandits who attempt to hijack the convoy. After losing Moonbeam and Bobby's bike, The Governor, the Humans survive the hijack attempt and successfully deliver the drugs to LA. While in the city, the Humans party at the Madfückers MC clubhouse, while Crispin accompanies Johnny on his ride to reunite with his long-lost love, Peg, who now strips at the Forbidden Zone in Oildale.

After calling out and ditching Crispin, Johnny rides alone to the Forbidden Zone, where he gets drunk while waiting for Peg to arrive for her shift. As he waits, a few locals pick a fight with him, nearly setting him on fire before being saved by the club's staff. Later, Peg arrives for her shift, surprised to find Johnny there. Back in Bakersfield at Flex Trucking, Crispin makes a deal to help Abe finish the Humans once and for all.

Characters

Humans MC
Johnny Moore (c. 1948-) - the vice president of the Humans MC Bakersfield charter. He was long thought killed in action in the Vietnam War, and the scars he brings back from the jungle run deep. His bike was Moonbeam, destroyed during a skirmish against Victor's Legion.
Karns (c. 1942-) - the weirdo and quiet killer, an ugly, mean, perverted, freak gorilla, but a Human through and through. His bike is the Mauler.
Doc (c. 1931-) - the adviser and chemist, a smart, careful and caring old orangutan who refuses to slow down or grow up. His bike is the Go-Cart, with a beer-keg sidecar.
Marra (c. 1945–1970) - the artist, poet and ladies 'mate, a pretty boy chimpanzee with a mean streak. He sees the poetry in violence and the freedom of the road. His bike is the Pequod.
Nada (c. 1947–1970) - the joker, a wild-eyed, drug-rattled orangutan with a smile as sharp as his blade, and Johnny's best friend. His bike is Matilda.
Crispin (c. 1941–1970) - the weasel and whiner, a crooked and lying gorilla who believes he should be president of the MC. His bike is the Dodger.
Bobby Moore (c. 1940–1970) - the former president and original member of the Humans, and Johnny's older brother. A cool, in control chimp, his voice was loud and his words were gospel. He was the Humans' best fighter, and he was quick and street smart. His bike was the Governor, destroyed during a skirmish against Victor's Legion. Killed by Skuz and Woz of the Skabbs MC in issue #7.
Bricks (c. 1944–1970) - the muscle and Skin-keeper, a gorilla as big as a house, but quiet as a mouse. His bike was the Monster Trike. Killed by the Skabbs MC in issue #7.
Marvin "Mojo" Hopper (c. 1939–1970) - a gorilla full of piss, whiskey and hate, he was the best 'mate to watch someone's back. He lived for action and never said no to a rumble. His bike was Black Magik. Killed by Woz of the Skabbs MC pre-issue #1.
Clyde (c. 1927-) - the mascot, Doc's soft-headed older brother.
Peg - Johnny's girlfriend
Queenie - Bobby's old lady
Florence - Karns' Skin slave girl whom he named after his mother
Cha-Cha - club property
Snaks - club property
Mols - club property

Music
At the end of each issue is a newsletter that features two to three songs from bands contributing a soundtrack for the series, with each issue containing one volume of music. Each new track is added to the Humans Soundtrack SoundCloud page. With the release of issue #7, the creators revealed they had opened up submissions for bands to write original songs inspired by the comic for the soundtrack. With the deadline on October 25, 2015, the winning tracks were included in the SoundCloud soundtrack release for issue #10, and artist Tom Neely designed a T-shirt graphic for the winning bands.

The Humans Soundtrack

1 Battle of the Bands winner2 Battle of the Bands honorary mention

Inspiration
Below are songs said to have inspired the writing for the comic.

Back Cover Pin-Up Artists

Benjamin Marra, Traditional Comics
Johnny Ryan, JohnnyRyan.com
SKINNER, The Art of Skinner
Katie Skelly, Katie Skelly Comics
Carmen Monoxide
Lale Westvind, Tumblr page
Jim Rugg, JimRugg.com
Jen Vaughn, Comics Curator Tumblr page/Cartozia Tales
Alexis Ziritt, AZiritt.com

External links

Humans For Life - The Humans official website
The Humans Soundtrack
Drippy Bone Books - Keenan Marshall Keller's official website
I Will Destroy You - Tom Neely's official website
Kristina Collantes
Image Comics

Culture of Bakersfield, California
Fictional apes
Apes in popular culture
Motorcycling in fiction
Comics set during the Vietnam War